The Bishop of Down and Dromore is the Ordinary of the Church of Ireland Diocese of Down and Dromore in the Province of Armagh. The diocese is situated in the north east of Ireland, which includes all of County Down, about half of the city of Belfast, and some parts of County Armagh east of the River Bann.

Until 1945, the sees of Down, Connor and Dromore were united under one bishop. On 1 January 1945, they were separated into the bishopric of Connor and the bishopric of Down & Dromore.

The current Incumbent is the Right Reverend David McClay, Bishop of Down and Dromore, who was elected by the Church of Ireland House of Bishops on 4 November 2019 and consecrated at St Anne's Cathedral, Belfast on 25 January 2020. The bishop's official residence is the See House, 32 Knockdene Park South, Belfast.

List of bishops

See also

Bishop of Connor
Bishop of Down
Bishop of Down and Connor
Bishop of Down, Connor and Dromore
Bishop of Dromore
Down Cathedral
Dromore Cathedral
St Anne’s Cathedral, Belfast

References

Bishops of Down and Dromore
Down and Dromore